Khaki Branazar (also Romanized as Khāḵī Brānāzār) is a village in Kakavand-e Gharbi Rural District, Kakavand District, Delfan County, Lorestan Province, Iran. At the 2006 census, its population was 34, in 6 families.

References 

Towns and villages in Delfan County